, also known as The Story of Town Where Cherry Blossoms Bloom, is the debut album of Japanese pop music trio Ikimono-gakari. It was released in Japan on March 7, 2007 under the label Epic. The album peaked at number four on the Oricon weekly charts and charted for nearly two years.

Tie-ups and theme songs
Many of the songs in this album were used as theme songs or in commercials. "Hanabi" was used the seventh ending theme song for the anime series Bleach. "Ryūsei Miracle" was used as a theme song for the anime Ghost Slayers Ayashi. "Seishun no Tobira" was used as the theme song to Japanese release of the movie Monster House.

The title song "Sakura" was used in a commercial advertisement promoting NTT Denpo115. "Uruwashiki Hito" was used in a commercial to promote Coca-Cola.

Track listing

References

Ikimono-gakari albums
2007 debut albums